The 1976 United States Senate election in Washington was held on November 2, 1976. Incumbent Democrat Henry M. Jackson, who had been a candidate for President earlier that year, won a fifth term in office with a landslide victory over Republican George Brown.

Blanket primary

Candidates

Democratic
Paul Gumbell
Henry M. Jackson, incumbent United States Senator
 Dennis "Hitch Hiker" Kelley

Republican
George M. Brown
William H. Davis, candidate for U.S. Senate in 1970
Warren E. Hanson, fisherman
Henry C. Nielsen
Wilbur R. Parkin, candidate for U.S. Representative in 1952 and 1954
Clarice L.R. "Tops" Privette, perennial candidate from Spokane

Results

General election

Results

See also 
 1976 United States Senate elections

References

1976
Washington
United States Senate